The Shanghai Caojing Power Station is a coal-fired power station in Jinshan District, Shanghai, China. The plant has an installed capacity of 2,000 MW. The station generates energy by two  units, which is fuelled by coal. The plant has a 210-metre chimney on-site.

The plant is operated by State Power Investment Corporation and Shanghai Electric and was created as a supporting project for Expo 2010 Shanghai China.

See also 

 List of coal power stations
 List of major power stations in Shanghai
 List of power stations in China

References 

Coal-fired power stations in China